The Topeka Mudcats are a women's professional American football team based in Topeka, Kansas, and a charter member of the Women's Spring Football League.

History

On June 13, 2009, the Topeka Mudcats made history in Topeka when the formation of the first women professional football team as formed.  May 1, 2010 was the first home game and made the capital city proud by defeating the River City Raiders 28–0.

Season-by-season

|-
|2010 || 3 || 4 || 0 || WSFL runners-up
|-
|2011 || 2|| 2 || 0 ||
|-
|Totals || 5 || 6 || 0

2010 roster

2010 season schedule

2011 season schedule

vs opponent

WSFL Midwest Division standings

y – Midwest Division title
x – Midwest Division runners-up

WSFL Heartland Division standings

y – Heartland Division title

x – Heartland Division runners-up

External links
Topeka Mudcats

Sports in Topeka, Kansas
Women's Spring Football League teams
American football teams in Kansas
American football teams established in 2009
2009 establishments in Kansas
Women's sports in Kansas